The Eastern Academy of Science and Technology, Bhubaneswar, (or EAST) is a private technical institution situated in Orissa, India. The college is located on the banks of the dried river Prachi at Phulnakhra in Bhubaneswar. The institute offers diploma, bachelor and masters technical courses.

History
The academy was established in the year 2001. EAST has been approved by the AICTE, recognized by the Government of Orissa, and is affiliated to Biju Patnaik University of Technology, Rourkela.

Courses
The academy offers degrees in:
 Bio-Medical Engineering (from 2006)
 Civil Engineering
 Computer Science Engineering
 Electrical Engineering (from 2002)
 Electronics and Instrumentation Engineering
 Electronics and Telecommunication Engineering
 Environmental Engineering (from 2006)
 Information Technology
 Mechanical Engineering (from 2003)

This college also offers M.tech degrees in;
Computer Science & Engineering
Electronics and Communication Engineering
Environmental Engineering
Mechanical Engineering

Admission
Admission to all bachelor's degree programs is through the State conducted Joint Entrance Examination (JEE) and AIEEE (All India Engineering Entrance Examination). Students with Diploma qualification are also inducted into the degree program in the second year of study.

References

External links 
 Eastern Academy of Science and Technology: Official website.

Private engineering colleges in India
Engineering colleges in Odisha
Colleges affiliated with Biju Patnaik University of Technology
Universities and colleges in Bhubaneswar
Science and technology in Bhubaneswar
Educational institutions established in 2001
2001 establishments in Orissa